Stählin may refer to
Friedrich Stählin (1874-1936), German philologist
Wilhelm Stählin (1883-1975), German theologian